Azari language may refer to:
Azerbaijani language, a modern language spoken in Azerbaijan and Northwest Iran, from Turkic language family
Old Azeri language, an old  language from Iranian language family